The three-finger salute is a hand gesture made by raising the index, middle and ring fingers, while holding the thumb to the little finger, and raising the hand with the palm facing out in a salute. The gesture was popularized in the 2010s after its use in The Hunger Games. The gesture has been adopted by protesters, particularly for pro-democracy protest movements in Southeast Asia, mainly in Thailand and Myanmar, as well as in other countries, including Hong Kong.

Origins
The gesture as popularized in the 2010s originated in The Hunger Games, the series of fiction books and films by Suzanne Collins. It bears resemblance to earlier salutes such as the Scout sign and salute and the Ukrainian salute mimicking the Tryzub symbol.

In The Hunger Games, the gesture is made by pressing the three middle fingers of the left hand to the lips and then raising it to the air. It initially appears in the first book and film of the series, when the people of District 12 salute Katniss Everdeen after she volunteers to participate in the Hunger Games in place of her sister. Later, in the second part of the series (Catching Fire), an old man in the crowd salutes Katniss this way during a tour by the victors, and the gesture becomes a symbol of the revolution along with the  mockingjay song whistled by Katniss in her first games.

Asian democracy movements

Thailand
The salute first became a real-world pro-democracy symbol in the aftermath of the 2014 Thai coup d'état. Due to its use, the symbol was made illegal in Thailand. Protesters have since added symbolism to the gesture, stating that the three fingers stand for the French Revolutionary ideal of liberty, equality, fraternity. The gesture was revived by protesters in the 2020 Thai political crisis.

Hong Kong

The salute was used for a time during the Umbrella Movement in 2014  before being revived in the 2019–2020 Hong Kong protests, inspired by its renewed usage in Thailand, and continues to be used to symbolize resistance against the Chinese government.

Myanmar

The salute became a symbol of opposition to the 2021 Myanmar coup d'état.

Cambodia
Mu Sochua, former vice president of the Cambodia National Rescue Party (CNRP), called on the opposition party's supporters to adopt the symbol as a sign of solidarity with Myanmar and as a protest against the current government of Hun Sen and the ruling Cambodian People's Party (CPP). A representative of the CPP condemned these actions, saying that they were undermining the country.

Other uses

Philippines

Before its adoption as a pro-democracy symbol, Philippine senator Miriam Defensor Santiago used it in a 2013 privilege speech in response to then-Senate president Juan Ponce Enrile, criticizing his personal and political conduct dating back to Ferdinand Marcos's regime, in response to his allegations about her mental health. In this context, she deviated from her prepared remarks after declaring, "His mind is sick, sick, sick...[You are] three times sick!" using the language of Katniss Everdeen in The Hunger Games: Catching Fire.

In 2017, a group of critics of President Rodrigo Duterte also used the salute to express dissent towards his administration and the killings related to the country's war on drugs.

United States
The non-profit organization Harry Potter Alliance used the three-finger salute to criticize economic and wage inequality in American companies such as Walmart and McDonald's. The move was supported by the AFL–CIO, who responded by posting pictures of union leaders posing with the symbol.

See also
 Rabia sign, similar gesture with four fingers
 Milk Tea Alliance, a democratic solidarity movement in Thailand, Taiwan, Hong Kong, and Myanmar

References

Hand gestures
Liberty symbols
Salutes